The Otis Elevating Railway was a  narrow gauge cable funicular railroad leading to the Catskill Mountain House in Palenville, New York. For the first 64 years of its existence, the Catskill Mountain House was accessible only by a long stagecoach from Catskill Landing on the Hudson. Faced with increased competition from the Hotel Kaaterskill (served by the Kaaterskill Railroad), Charles Beach hired the Otis Elevator Company to build a cable funicular railroad straight up the Great Wall of Manitou. In 1904, the line was shortened and the lower trestle eliminated.

A cable pulled the specially-designed passenger cars up the mountain, hooking a mechanism from the car onto the cable. To balance the system there were two cars which could each seat 75 passengers. The cars were built by Jackson & Sharp Co. in 1892.  The cars were named Rickerson and Van Santvoord.  A small open-air baggage car was coupled to the downhill end of each passenger car.

The cable was pulled by two Hamilton Corliss steam engines that spun a set of cogwheels that drove the cable. Each engine had a  diameter bore and a  stroke. Steam was supplied by two Manning Patent vertical tubular boilers.  As one car went up from the bottom of the incline, the other car went down from the top of the incline. There was a passing track in the middle of the run where the track split in two and then rejoined. This was so the cars could pass each other without colliding, as they shared the center rail above and below the passing track.

The Otis Railway and the Catskill Mountain Railway had several freight cars interchangeable with both the Catskill and Tannersville Railway at Summit Station and the Catskill Mountain Railway at Junction Station. One car could be carried at a time coupled below the coach. Boxcars were Otis Ry. 1, Otis Ry. 2, C.M. Ry. 17 & C.M. Ry. 18. Gondolas were Otis Ry. 3, Otis Ry. 4, C.M. Ry. 15 & C.M. Ry. 16. In operation, a single freight car could be coupled to the downhill end of the open-air baggage car.

The Otis Junction station (pictured right after the 1904 reconstruction) connected the Otis to the Catskill Mountain Railway, a  railroad between Catskill Landing and Palenville, New York. In 1918, all three railroads were closed and sold for scrap. The two cars survive to this day. Soon after the railroad was scrapped, the coaches were shipped to Chattanooga, Tennessee, where they served the Lookout Mountain Incline Railway.

Stations
 Otis Junction Station
 Otis Summit Station

See also 
 List of funicular railways

References

External links
Catskill Mountain System
How the Otis Elevating Railway worked
Otis Elevating, at the Ulster and Delaware Railroad Historical Society
 

Railway
Defunct New York (state) railroads
Catskills
Transportation in Greene County, New York
3 ft gauge railways in the United States
Narrow gauge railroads in New York (state)
Defunct funicular railways in the United States
Railway inclines in the United States
1892 establishments in New York (state)
1918 disestablishments in New York (state)